The Shad-Wyck was an American automobile manufactured from 1917 until 1918 in Frankfort, Indiana.

History 
Run by the automobile dealer Shadburne Brothers of Chicago, the company's initial offerings seem to have been rebranded Bour-Davis cars.  The name of the car was meant to invoke the famous Chadwick and advertising used images of the Roamer to represent a Shad-Wyck.

Bour-Davis  had been purchased by the brothers and production moved from Detroit to Frankfort. They announced that they would also be producing cars to their own designs but there is doubt if this ever happened.  Bour-Davis was sold again to the Louisiana Motor Car Company and moved to Shreveport where production continued until 1923.

The Shadborne Brothers returned to Chicago and a new line of Shad-Wyck models was announced as late as 1920.  No cars were actually made.

References

Defunct motor vehicle manufacturers of the United States
Motor vehicle manufacturers based in Indiana
Vehicle manufacturing companies established in 1917
Vehicle manufacturing companies disestablished in 1918
Defunct companies based in Indiana
1910s cars
Vintage vehicles
Cars introduced in 1917